Kanievsky or Kaniewski is a Polish or Jewish surname. It may refer to:

Batsheva Kanievsky (1932–2011), Israeli rebbetzin
Chaim Kanievsky (1928-2022), Israeli rabbi
Jan Ksawery Kaniewski (1805-1867)
Maria Kaniewska (1911-2005), Polish actress
Yaakov Yisrael Kanievsky (1899–1985), Israeli rabbi

See also
Kanevsky (disambiguation)

Jewish surnames
Slavic-language surnames
Jewish families